This list of European animals extinct in the Holocene features animals known to have become extinct in the last 12,000 years on the European continent and its surrounding islands.

All large islands in the Mediterranean Sea are included except for Cyprus, which is in the List of Asian animals extinct in the Holocene. The recently extinct animals of the Macaronesian islands in the North Atlantic are listed separately. Overseas territories of European countries are not included here; they are found on the lists pertaining to their respective regions. For example, French Polynesia is grouped with Oceania, while Réunion is grouped with Madagascar and the Indian Ocean islands. 

Many extinction dates are unknown due to a lack of relevant information.

Mammals

Undated

Prehistoric

Recent

Local

Birds

Reptiles

Fish

Insects

Sea anemones

Molluscs

See also 
 Limousin horse, extinct
 List of extinct animals of Catalonia
 List of extinct animals of Caucasus
 List of extinct animals of the British Isles
 List of extinct and endangered species of Italy
 List of extinct and endangered animals of Lithuania
 List of extinct animals of the Netherlands
 List of extinct species
 List of extinct bird species since 1500
 Extinct in the wild
 Lazarus taxon

Notes

References

External links 
 The Extinction Website
 IUCN Red List of Threatened Species
 European Union - Nature and Biodiversity

Europe
 
†Extinct